Who Killed Sgt. Pepper? is the eleventh studio album by American psychedelic rock band The Brian Jonestown Massacre. It was  
released in February 2010 on band leader Anton Newcombe's A Records.

Recording 

The album was recorded in Iceland and at Studio East in Berlin.

Personnel 

The album guest features, among a variety of international musicians, Spacemen 3 bassist Will Carruthers and vocalists Unnur Andrea Einarsdottir and Felix Bondareff.

Content 

The album's title refers to The Beatles' 1967 album Sgt. Pepper's Lonely Hearts Club Band. It may also refer to Who Killed Bambi?, an early working title for The Sex Pistols' film The Great Rock 'N' Roll Swindle, as well as a song on the film's soundtrack. It may also refer to the book Who Killed Christopher Robin? The Truth Behind the Murder of Brian Jones, a book about the death of Brian Jones of the Rolling Stones, who inspired the band's name. It may also refer to "Who Shot Mr. Burns?", a two-part episode of The Simpsons, an animated sitcom in which the surviving members of The Beatles had previously guest-starred.

Release 

The album was available for free streaming prior to release, and like My Bloody Underground, music videos were made for each of the album's songs.

Track listing

"Tempo 116.7 (Reaching for Dangerous Levels of Sobriety)" - 5:35
"Þungur hnífur" (Icelandic for "A Heavy Knife") - 4:11
"Lets Go Fucking Mental" - 4:43
"White Music" - 3:31
"This Is the First of Your Last Warnings" (Icelandic version) - 6:15
"This Is the One Thing We Did Not Want to Have Happen" - 8:05
"The One" - 4:11
"Someplace Else Unknown" - 6:26
"Detka! Detka! Detka!" (Russian for "Baby") - 5:25
"Super Fucked" - 6:36
"Our Time" - 3:03
"Feel It (Of Course We Fucking Do)" - 6:33
"Felt Tipped-Pen Pictures of UFOs" - 9:56

Personnel
Anton Newcombe - Vocals, guitar, electronics
Will Carruthers - Bass, vocals (tracks 3,6)
Matt Hollywood - Guitar 
Unnur Andrea Einarsdottir - Vocals (tracks 5,7)
Felix Bondareff - Vocals (tracks 2,9)
Jón Sæmundur - Guitar
Henrik Baldvin Bjornsson – Guitar
Constantine Karlis – Drums

References

2010 albums
The Brian Jonestown Massacre albums